Napier Operatic Society (often abbreviated as NOS) is an amateur theatre society based in Napier, New Zealand. Established in 1887, Napier Operatic Society is the second oldest-existing theatrical society in New Zealand, and is nationally renowned for its critically acclaimed professional-quality productions.

The society is based at The Tabard Theatre, which underwent extensive renovations completed in April 1994 – an extended rehearsal room, wardrobe hire, workshop, and restaurant-theatre complex were completed during the 5-year project. The Napier Operatic Society produces multiple productions a year, and has done a major stage-show every year since 1887, with the exception of several years throughout the 20th century during overseas conflict and the aftermath of natural disaster.

History

The earliest known theatre company in Napier was the Napier Theatre Co., which in 1883, along with the Napier Musical Society and the Napier Amateur Drama Club combined to create the Theatre Royal. The Theatre Royal made its debut with the musical Trial by Jury, and out of this the Napier Operatic Society was born.

Most of the early productions were Gilbert and Sullivan plays, with the first production at the new Napier Municipal Theatre being A Greek Slave in 1912. The 1800 capacity of the Napier Municipal Theatre was noted to have been "frequently taxed to the uttermost", especially by people who drive in from the country areas. Due to the onset of World War I, The Blue Moon was the last production by Napier Operatic Society until 1921.

 The 1931 Napier earthquake caused significant damage to the Napier Municipal Theatre, contributing to Napier Operatic's hiatus until 1937. A Special General Meeting was held on 14 October 1937 where it was unanimously decided to revive the society. The first production in over 7 years, Rio Rita, was performed at the newly built Napier Municipal Theatre. Since then, with the exception of during World War II until 1953, there has been at least one production put on by Napier Operatic Society every year.

Napier Operatic Society has staged many hit musicals in recent years, including Les Misérables, 42nd Street, Chicago, Cats, Beauty and the Beast, Miss Saigon, The Phantom of the Opera, Mamma Mia!, and Evita. Napier Operatic Society have since begun staging larger productions that typically would be seen at the Napier Municipal Theatre at the Tabard Theatre, such as Evita, Jesus Christ Superstar, and Blood Brothers.

Productions: 1887–present

Society presidents: 1890–present

Honorary life members

"*" denotes deceased

Theatre School 

The Napier Operatic Society Theatre School (often abbreviated as NOS Theatre School) was one of the first youth theatre programmes to have been established by an existing amateur musical theatre society in New Zealand. Under the direction of Sonya Aifai since 2000, the theatre school has trained aspiring actors by casting them in yearly productions. 

The Napier Operatic Society Theatre School has been nationally recognised, including in 2017 when it was awarded the Excellence in Acting award at the Junior Theatre Celebration in Auckland. Subsequently, in both 2018 and 2019, theatre school alumnus Jackson Stone was awarded Outstanding Male Performer two years in a row for his roles as Donkey in Shrek Jr., and as Don Lockwood in Singin' in the Rain Jr.. Stone, alongside of other notable theatre school members Marcus Allan, Maia Driver, and Renee Seymour, represented NOS and New Zealand at the Junior Theatre Festival in Atlanta in 2020.

Founding members of the Theatre School have gone on to perform directing roles on a local and national level; including Alice Pardoe in stage management for Taki Rua, Anne Aifai in choreography, Rachael McKinnon in directing, and Anthony Collier in directing and the establishment of Napier Theatre Company.

Theatre School productions: 2000–present

References

External links 
 
 

Theatre companies in New Zealand
Amateur theatre
Napier, New Zealand
1887 establishments in New Zealand